Eugene Paul Bennett VC MC (4 June 1892 – 6 April 1970) was an English recipient of the Victoria Cross, the highest and most prestigious award for gallantry in the face of the enemy that can be awarded to British and Commonwealth forces.

He was born in Cainscross, Stroud, Gloucestershire, the fourth of five sons of Mr and Mrs Charles Bennett. Bennett was a pupil of Marling School from 1905 to 1908 having gained a scholarship from Uplands School, Stroud.

Bennett was 24 years old, and a Temporary Lieutenant in the 2nd Battalion, The Worcestershire Regiment, British Army during the First World War when on 5 November 1916 near Le Transloy France the deed took place for which he was awarded the VC.

The award citation published in the London Gazette reads:

Bennett first served in the ranks of the Artists' Rifles and later achieved the rank of captain.  After World War I he became a lawyer, being called to the bar in 1923, then serving as Prosecuting Counsel from 1931 to 1935 and a Metropolitan Magistrate from 1935 to his retirement in 1961. During World War II he served as an officer in the Air Training Corps of the RAF. He retired to Vicenza, in northern Italy, where he died at the age of 77.

His Victoria Cross is displayed at the Worcestershire Regiment collection in the Worcester City Art Gallery & Museum in Worcester, England.

References

Monuments to Courage (David Harvey, 1999)
The Register of the Victoria Cross (This England, 1997)
VCs of the First World War - The Somme (Gerald Gliddon, 1994)
Marling School 1887–1987 (W. Oliver Wicks, 1986)

1892 births
1970 deaths
British Army personnel of World War I
Worcestershire Regiment officers
British Battle of the Somme recipients of the Victoria Cross
Recipients of the Military Cross
English barristers
People from Stroud District
Artists' Rifles soldiers
People educated at Marling School
British Army recipients of the Victoria Cross
Military personnel from Gloucestershire
Royal Air Force personnel of World War II
Stipendiary magistrates (England and Wales)